The men's singles competition was one of two rackets events held as part of the Rackets at the 1908 Summer Olympics programme. Nations could enter up to 12 players, though only Great Britain competed and with a total of 6 players.

Results

Standings

Bracket

References

 
 

Men's singles